= Entertainment Express =

Nigerian newspaper

Entertainment Express is a Nigerian newspaper founded in July 2011 by Mike Awoyinfa and late Pastor Dimgba Igwe, centered on movies, music, and sports. Among the pioneer staff were Azuh Amatus (Editor), Femi Salawu, Ameh Comrade Godwin. The paper folded up and migrated online in 2014 following the death of Pastor.

There office is located at Oshodi-Isolo LGA in Lagos State.
